State Route 180 (abbreviated SR 180) is a secondary south–north highway in Haywood and Lauderdale Counties, Tennessee, United States. State Route 180 is 12.52 mi (20.1 km) long.

State Route 180 starts in Nutbush in Haywood County, childhood home of singer Tina Turner, and continues north to Gates in Lauderdale County.

The rolling hills of Tennessee and cotton fields dominate the rural landscape of the area traversed by SR 180.

State Route 180 is located on the southeastern edge of the New Madrid Seismic Zone, an area with a high earthquake risk.

Counties traversed
State Route 180 traverses the counties (south to north) shown in the table below.

Points of interest
Points of interest along State Route 180 (south to north).

 Nutbush, Tennessee, childhood home of singer Tina Turner
 Trinity United Methodist Church, Nutbush

History

Earthquake risk
State Route 180 is situated on the southeastern edge of the New Madrid Seismic Zone, an area with a high earthquake risk.

In 1811 and 1812 several earthquakes with the epicenter near New Madrid, Missouri caused permanent changes in the course of the Mississippi River in a wide area, including the Mississippi River valley in West Tennessee.

Churches
Trinity United Methodist Church, founded in 1822, is located just south of the southern terminus of SR 180 in Nutbush.

More than 50 Civil War soldiers, both Confederate and Union soldiers, are buried in the Trinity Cemetery associated with the church.

Agriculture and industry

After the abolition of slavery, sharecropping was the primary means of income for low income families in the area along SR 180. Mostly for the cultivation of cotton, land would be used by sharecroppers in return for a share of the crop to the landowner.

Modern agriculture
Modern machines like the cotton picker have made the manual cultivation obsolete over time as they took over the work from the manual laborers.

In 2006, a cotton-processing plant exists in Nutbush at the junction of SR 180 and State Route 19.

Lagoon Creek Peaking Facility
Lagoon Creek Peaking Facility is run by the Tennessee Valley Authority (TVA) in Nutbush not far from State Route 180. From twelve gas turbines the power plant generates electric power for the area in times of high demand.

Music

The early black and white musicians and singers from the Nutbush churches along today's State Route 180 recorded and influenced an international audience.

Nutbush is the birthplace and home community of black and white pioneer musicians and prominent recording artists such as Hambone Willie Newbern and Sleepy John Estes.

Harmonica player Noah Lewis of Henning, Tennessee is buried in an area cemetery near Nutbush.

Singer Tina Turner spent her childhood in Nutbush, Tennessee, 7 mi (11 km) northwest of Brownsville, where State Route 180 starts at State Route 19, part of which was named "Tina Turner Highway" in 2002, in honor of the singer.

Major intersections

See also

 List of Tennessee state highways
 List of highways numbered 180
 1811–12 New Madrid earthquakes

References

Further reading

External links

 Tennessee Department of Transportation
 Official Lauderdale County Website
 Haywood County Official Web Site

180
Transportation in Haywood County, Tennessee
Transportation in Lauderdale County, Tennessee